Thomas B. Sumner (March 25, 1857 – April 5, 1934) was an American politician in the state of Washington. He served in the Washington State Senate from 1901 to 1909. From 1903 to 1905, he was President pro tempore of the Senate.

References

Republican Party Washington (state) state senators
1857 births
1934 deaths